Events from the year 1408 in France

Incumbents
 Monarch – Charles VI

Events
 November – The Council of Perpignan convenes

Deaths
 4 December – Valentina Visconti, Duchess of Orléans, noblewoman (born 1371)

References

1400s in France